Senkichi (written: 仙吉 or 千吉) is a masculine Japanese given name. Notable people with the name include:

 (1893–1945), Japanese government official and mayor
 (1912–2007), Japanese film director and screenwriter

Japanese masculine given names